EverQuest Online Adventures (EQOA) was a 2003 3D fantasy massively multiplayer online role-playing game (MMORPG) for the PlayStation 2.  The game was part of the EverQuest franchise before being shut down on March 29, 2012, after nine years of operation.

An expansion pack was launched on November 17, 2003, titled EverQuest Online Adventures: Frontiers; it added a playable race—the Ogre—and character class—Alchemist—as well as many quests and items.

Setting and gameplay
EverQuest Online Adventures was set in the fictional world of Norrath 500 years prior to the original EverQuest, in the "Age of Adventure".  The world featured many places familiar to fans of the original and most of the differences were explained in the lore of EverQuest. The gameplay focused on character advancement, environment combat, quests, exploration, grouping, and socializing. It also contained a simple PVP system that allowed two players to fight one another.

There were fifteen playable classes, and ten races.

Development

EverQuest Online Adventures was developed and published by Sony Online Entertainment (SOE), and first released on February 11, 2003, in North America. The game was developed so that it did not require a hard disk drive (HDD) like Final Fantasy XI did. Since no HDD for the system was ever released in PAL territories, EQOA remained the only MMORPG there.

EverQuest Online Adventures: Frontiers was launched on November 17, 2003. Frontiers added a playable race—the Ogre—and character class—Alchemist—as well as many quests and items.

The continued development of content after the first expansion was introduced as free content updates instead of additional expansion packs.

The end of EverQuest Online Adventures was announced on the game's site on February 29, 2012.  The shut down date was Thursday, March 29, 2012.

References

External links
 

2003 video games
Massively multiplayer online role-playing games
Products and services discontinued in 2012
EverQuest
Inactive massively multiplayer online games
PlayStation 2 games
PlayStation 2-only games
Video games developed in the United States